DynoVoice Records was an American record label, founded in 1965 by songwriter/producer Bob Crewe. The label started as Dyno-Vox, but was changed when the 5th single was issued. DynoVoice, along with its NewVoice Records subsidiary, was originally distributed by Bell Records, and later by Dot Records. The label existed until 1969 when it was merged into the Crewe Group of Companies (CGC) label.  Some of the label's best-known releases include The Bob Crewe Generation's hit  "Music to Watch Girls By", the soundtrack album for Dino de Laurentiis's camp sci-fi film Barbarella, and material by Mitch Ryder and the Detroit Wheels.

Notable artists
 Eddie Rambeau 
 The Toys
 The Bob Crewe Generation
 The Chicago Loop
 The Glitterhouse
 Mitch Ryder & the Detroit Wheels
 Steve Walker and the Bold
 Maggie Thrett

See also
 List of record labels

References

External links
 DynoVoice history & discography
 DynoVoice Fan Tribute page
 DynoVoice 45 Discography

American record labels
Record labels established in 1965
Record labels disestablished in 1969
Pop record labels